The Album is the only studio album by American hip hop group The Firm. It was released on October 21, 1997, by Aftermath Entertainment and Interscope Records. The project was created by rapper Nas, his manager Steve Stoute and producers Dr. Dre and Trackmasters, who came up with the idea of forming a hip hop supergroup. The original line-up included Nas, AZ, Foxy Brown and Cormega who were all featured on the song "Affirmative Action" from Nas' album It Was Written (1996). However, Cormega later left the group due to artistic differences between him and Nas, as well as contract disagreements with Stoute. He was replaced by Nature prior to recording of the album. The Album is a concept album that revolves around the themes of mafia and "gangsta" lifestyle. The songs on the album were mainly produced by Dr. Dre, Chris "The Glove" Taylor and Trackmasters (as Poke and Tone), and feature guest vocals from Pretty Boy, Wizard, Canibus, Dawn Robinson, Noreaga and Half-a-Mill.

The Album received mixed reviews from the music critics, who criticized its mainstream pop-oriented sound rather than the members' previous styles. In the United States, the album debuted at number one on the Billboard 200 and also topped the Top R&B/Hip-Hop Albums chart. It also charted in other countries, such as Canada, France and the United Kingdom. The Album sold 147,000 copies in the debut week and has sold over 925,000 copies in the United States and was certified gold in Canada. Two singles were released from the album, with "Firm Biz" peaking at number twelve on the Hot R&B/Hip-Hop Airplay and number eighteen on the UK Singles Chart. Although the album's second single "Phone Tap" failed to chart, it remained the group signature song.

Background
Prior to the formation of The Firm, future members and affiliates of the group were at transitional stages of their careers. Following the acclaim of his landmark debut album Illmatic (1994), Queensbridge-based emcee Nas decided to concentrate his efforts in a mainstream direction. Despite its significant impact on hip hop at the time, Illmatic did not experience the larger sales of most major releases of the day, due in part to Nas' shy personality and withdrawal from promoting the record. Nas began to make appearances on other artists' work, including "Fast Life" on Kool G Rap's "4,5,6" and "Verbal Intercourse" on Raekwon's Only Built 4 Cuban Linx... (1995). Nas began to dub himself as Nas Escobar on these guest appearances. Meanwhile, his excessive spending habits had left him with little money, as Nas had to ask for a loan to purchase clothes to wear to the 1995 Source Awards. The success of fellow East Coast act The Notorious B.I.G. at the awards show sent a message to Nas to change his commercial approach, resulting in his hiring of Steve "The Commissioner" Stoute as manager. While Illmatic attained gold status, Stoute convinced Nas to aim his efforts in a more commercial direction for his second album, after which Nas enlisted production team the Trackmasters, who were known for their mainstream success at the time.

Meanwhile, Brooklyn-based female rapper Foxy Brown was brought to the attention of the Trackmasters, who were working on LL Cool J's Mr. Smith (1995). After impressing the production team with an on-stage freestyle rap, she earned a guest appearance on Mr. Smith, contributing a verse to the remix of "I Shot Ya". Throughout 1995 and 1996, Brown appeared on several platinum and gold singles, including Jay-Z's "Ain't No Nigga" and the remix of Toni Braxton's "You're Makin' Me High". Her appearances sparked a recording company bidding war in early 1996, leading to her signing to Def Jam Recordings. The success of "I Shot Ya" prompted her inclusion, along with rappers AZ and Cormega, in collaborating with Nas on the song "Affirmative Action" for his second studio album, It Was Written (1996). The collaboration came in the wake of the critical success of AZ's debut album Doe or Die (1995). He initially garnered attention with his appearance on Nas' "Life's a Bitch" (1993). Cormega, whose rapping career had been put on hold due to his incarceration during the early 1990s, was referenced by Nas on "One Love" (1994), and was released from jail in 1995.

Working with the Trackmasters as producers, Brown released her solo debut Ill Na Na (1996), which became a chart success and sold over two million copies.

In an interview AZ personally picked Firm Biz, Phone Tap and Throw Your Guns as his favorites songs on the album.

In an interview, Dr. Dre gave a reason why the album was a failure. "When we were doing that record, it was a lot of problems in the studio. I only spent maybe four days in the studio with the artists and we're supposed to do a record with them for days. The all album. Nas was cool. He came in and did his thing. Foxy missed like 5 airplanes to getting to the studio. She's in here like 1 hour so we got to work with her 1 hour. That's the reason why that record wasn't successful as we planned".

In an interview, The Glove explained the mixed reception of the album:

Title
According to critic Steve "Flash" Juon of RapReviews, the title of the album, as well as the group's name, was inspired by John Grisham's 1991 legal thriller-novel The Firm and the 1993 film adaption of the same name. While it was issued under the title The Album, writers and music critics have referred to the album with such titles as The Firm, Nas, Foxy Brown, AZ, and Nature Present the Firm: The Album, and The Firm — The Album, or The Firm: The Album.

Commercial Performance 
The Album charted for 22 Weeks in The United States, 11 Weeks in Canada, 7 Weeks in The Netherlands, 5 Weeks in The United Kingdom, and 2 Weeks in France.

Track listing

Sample credits
"Phone Tap", samples "Petite Fleur" by Chris Barber's Jazz Band
"Fuck Somebody Else", samples "You Gonna Make Me Love Somebody Else" by The Jones Girls
"Hardcore", samples "Your Love (Encore)" by Cheryl Lynn
"Five Minutes to Flush (Intro)", samples "Hard to Handle" by Etta James
"Five Minutes to Flush", samples "Five Minutes Of Funk" by Whodini
"Firm Biz", samples "Square Biz" by Teena Marie
"Firm All Stars", samples "Turn Off the Lights" by Young Larry
"Firm Fiasco", samples "A Ma Fille" by Charles Aznavour
"Firm Family" samples "Come On Sexy Mama" by The Moments
"Untouchable", samples "Mother Nature" by The Temptations
"I'm Leaving", samples "I'm Leaving On a Jet Plane" by John Denver
"Desparados", samples "Dune" by Wasis Diop
"Executive Decision", samples "Ô Corse île d'amour" by Tino Rossi

Charts

Weekly charts

Year-end charts

Certifications

See also
 List of Billboard 200 number-one albums of 1997
 List of Billboard number-one R&B albums of 1997

Notes

References

External links
 [ The Album] at AllMusic
 

1997 debut albums
Aftermath Entertainment albums
AZ (rapper) albums
Foxy Brown (rapper) albums
Albums produced by Dr. Dre
Nas albums
Nature (rapper) albums
Interscope Records albums
Columbia Records albums
Mafioso rap albums